Krzewent is a village situated in Kowal's community of Wloclawek's district and Kujawsko-pomorskie department.
Its area is 200 ha.
The village is situated in Gostynicko-Wloclawski landscaped park and it is a part of plan a nature security "Natura 2000".
Krzewent is situated between three lakes: Rakutowskie, Lubiechowskie, Krzewenckie. 

Since ten years Polish Association of Pidgey's farmers exists in the village.
The village's area is full of forests and fields. People of Krzewent are not only farmers but they also work as hunters, fishermen, and timbermen. 

Many people from Krzewent move out to bigger agglomerations for better jobs.

References

Krzewent